The Hoboken mayoral election of 2017 was an election to determine who will hold the office of Mayor of Hoboken, New Jersey in the upcoming term of 2018–2022. The election took place on November 7, 2017. Incumbent Mayor Dawn Zimmer announced that she would not run for a third term on June 20, 2017, hoping to pursue climate change issues higher up in the chain of government, and endorsed City Councilman Ravinder Bhalla. On November 7, Bhalla was elected mayor of Hoboken, with 32.75% of the vote, becoming the first Sikh mayor in New Jersey history, and the first turbaned Sikh  to be elected mayor in the United States.

Candidates
Six candidates in total ran in the election:

Declared
 Ronald Bautista, safer streets activist
 Ravinder Bhalla, City Councilman, At-large
 Michael DeFusco, City Councilman, 1st Ward
 Jen Giattino, City Council President, 6th Ward
 Karen Nason, restaurateur
 Anthony Romano, Hudson County Freeholder

Results

References

Hoboken mayoral
Hoboken
Hoboken, New Jersey
Mayoral elections in Hoboken, New Jersey